Osinniki (Taƣdaƣaal), known until 1938 as Osinovka, is a town in Kemerovo Oblast, Russia. Population:

Administrative and municipal status
Within the framework of administrative divisions, it is, together with one rural locality, incorporated as Osinniki Town Under Oblast Jurisdiction—an administrative unit with the status equal to that of the districts. As a municipal division, Osinniki Town Under Oblast Jurisdiction is incorporated as Osinnikovsky Urban Okrug.

References

Notes

Sources

Cities and towns in Kemerovo Oblast